Netty Herawaty (4 April 1929 – 6 February 1989) was an Indonesian actress who made more than fifty films between 1949 and 1986.

Born in Surabaya, as a teenager Herawaty toured Java with a number of stage troupes during the Japanese occupation and Indonesian National Revolution. In 1949, she made her feature film debut in Fred Young's Saputangan. After two years of collaborating with Young, appearing in a total of eight films for his Bintang Surabaja Film Corporation, Herawaty migrated to Djamaluddin Malik's Persari, where she soon became one of the company's most popular stars and appeared in such films as Rodrigo de Villa (1952) and Lewat Djam Malam (1955). When Persari was shut down, Herawaty returned to the theatre, spending most of the 1960s away from Indonesia's struggling film industry. She returned to screen in the 1970s, appearing in supporting roles in more than thirty films before her death.

Early life
Herawaty was born on 4 April 1929 at Surabaya, East Java, Dutch East Indies. She graduated from the R.K. Zuster School before becoming active on stage at age thirteen, when she joined Irama Masa, a theatrical company established by the Japanese occupation government. Later in 1943, she married Darussalam, a fellow actor with the company who was ten years her senior. According to an interview with Kentjana, the couple fell in love while their troupe was on a boat returning from Makassar. By 1953 they had one child, a daughter named Rustiany.

In 1945, following the surrender of Japan and the proclamation of Indonesian independence, Herawaty and her husband established the troupe Trimurti, based out of Gombong, Central Java. They toured Java and supported the Indonesians fighting against the returning Dutch colonial forces. This troupe had collapsed by 1947, and the two spent time with Djamaluddin Malik's troupe Bintang Timur and Fred Young's Bintang Surabaja.

Herawaty then established Panggung Bhakti Artis along with Mimi Mariani.

Bintang Surabaja and Persari

When Young established his own film company in 1949, also called Bintang Surabaja, Herawaty made the transition to film. Her first role was in Saputangan. This was followed by seven further films for the company, including Bintang Surabaja 1951 (1950), Djembatan Merah (1950), and Selamat Berdjuang, Masku! (1951). Herawaty's greatest success during the 1950s, however, was with Djamaluddin Malik's Persari. She joined the company shortly after it was established, appearing in early productions such as Sepandjang Malioboro (1951) and Surjani Mulia (1951), and was often cast along with Rd Mochtar.

In 1952 Herawaty was part of a group of Persari actors and crew members who spent nearly two years in the Philippines to study filmmaking and produce two Ansco Colour films in collaboration with LVN Studio. In the first of these productions, the Indonesian-language edition of Rodrigo de Villa (1952), she was cast in the role of Jimena, the daughter of a treasonous courtier who falls in love with a loyal royalist. The second production, Leilani (also Tabu, 1953) saw Herawaty take the title role as a newlywed separated from her groom by a storm.

Upon returning to Indonesia in 1953, Herawaty continued acting for Persari, appearing in a further seven films for the company. This included the role of Norma, the fiancée of a returned guerrilla, in the Perfini–Persari collaboration Lewat Djam Malam, which won a Citra Award for Best Film at the 1955 Indonesian Film Festival. By 1954 Herawaty was considered part of the Persari's "Big Four", together with Darussalam, fellow actress Titien Sumarni, and Mochtar. The following year she was named most popular Indonesian actress by the magazine Film Varia, though the film critic Salim Said suggests Malik influenced this decision; Sumarni, who had had a falling out with Persari, had won the popular vote.

Later life and career
In 1957, Malik was accused of corruption and placed under house arrest. The following year Persari was closed and much of its staff dispersed. Herawaty, rather than stay in the struggling film industry, returned to the theatre. With Darussalam, she established  the Herawaty National Theatre in 1958, but over the next decade she acted with several troupes. Herawaty made only one film in the 1960s, Nenny (1968).

In the 1970s Herawaty made another return to cinema, albeit mostly in supporting roles. She featured in more than thirty films between Djembatan Emas (1971) and Bintang Kejora (1986), including several films starring the dangdut singer Rhoma Irama.

Herawaty died on 6 February 1989, aged 59. She was survived by Darussalam.

Filmography
In her thirty-seven-year acting career, Herawaty appeared in some fifty-five films.

Saputangan (1949)
Bintang Surabaja 1951 (1950)
Damarwulan (1950)
Djembatan Merah (1950)
Harumanis (1950)
Ratapan Ibu (1950)
Bakti Bahagia (1951)
Hidup Baru (1951)
Ditepi Bengawan Solo (1951)
Main-Main Djadi Sungguhan (1951)
Sepandjang Malioboro (1951)
Surjani Mulia (1951)
Pahlawan (1951)
Selamat Berdjuang, Masku! (1951)
Rodrigo de Villa (1952)
Asam Digunung Garam Dilaut (1953)
Gara-gara Hadiah (1953)
Kenari (1953)
Leilani (Tabu) (1953)
Air Pasang (1954)
Lewat Djam Malam (1954)
Tjalon Duta (1955)
Karlina Marlina (1957)
Nenny (1968)
Djembatan Emas (The Golden Bridge) (1971)
Mawar Rimba (1972)
Ratu Ular (1972)
Si Rano (1973)
Drakula Mantu (Benyamin Kontra Drakula) (1974)
Cinta Remaja (1974)
Kasih Sayang (1974)
Wulan di Sarang Penculik (1975)
Kenapa Kau Pergi (1975)
Surat Undangan (1975)
Boss Bagio dalam Gembong Ibukota (1976)
Oma Irama Penasaran (1976)
Naga Merah (1976)
One Way Ticket (Semoga Kau Kembali) (1976)
Wajah Tiga Perempuan (1976)
Badai Pasti Berlalu (1977)
Marina (1977)
Cinta Bersemi (1977)
Tinggal Bersama (1977)
Santara Menumpas Perdagangan Sex (1977)
Rahasia Seorang Ibu (1977)
Gitar Tua Oma Irama (1977)
Gara-gara Isteri Muda (1977)
Cinta Putih (Bidan Aminah) (1977)
Raja Dangdut (1978)
Istri Dulu Istri Sekarang (1978)
Aduh Aduh Mana Tahan (1980)
Bodoh-bodoh Mujur (1981)
Hati yang Perawan (1984)
Gadis Hitam Putih (1985)
Bintang Kejora (1986)

References

Works cited

External links

 

1929 births
1989 deaths
Indonesian film actresses
People from Surabaya
Indonesian stage actresses